David Patterson Ellerman (born 14 March 1943) is a philosopher and author who works in the fields of economics and political economy, social theory and philosophy, quantum mechanics, and in mathematics.  He has written extensively on workplace democracy based on a modern treatment of the labor theory of property and the theory of inalienable rights as rights based on de facto inalienable capacities.

Education 

Ellerman was born 14 March 1943.
He received an undergraduate degree in philosophy from Massachusetts Institute of Technology in 1965.  He went on to Boston University for his graduate work, receiving an MA in philosophy of science in 1967, an MA in economics in 1968, and a doctorate in mathematics in 1972.  His PhD thesis was titled Sheaves Of Relational Structures And Ultraproducts, and was advised by Rohit Jivanlal Parikh.

Career 
After his PhD, Ellerman remained teaching at Boston University in the mathematics and then the economic department until 1976.  He then taught economics at the University of Massachusetts, Boston until 1982, then at Boston College until 1987, and finally at Tufts University until 1990. In 1990, he moved to Ljubljana, Slovenia, where he started a labor consulting firm.  From 1992 until 2003, he worked at the World Bank as an economics advisor to the Chief Economist (Joseph Stiglitz and Nicholas Stern).  From 2003 to 2020, he was a visiting scholar at the University of California, Riverside and since 2020, he is an associate researcher at the University of Ljubljana.

Books
Ellerman's books include:
 New Foundations for Information Theory: Logical Entropy and Shannon Entropy. SpringerNature, 2021. .
 Putting Jurisprudence Back into Economics: What is Really Wrong in Today's Neoclassical Theory. SpringerNature, 2021. . 
 Neo-Abolitionism: Abolishing Human Rentals in Favor of Workplace Democracy. SpringerNature, 2021. .
 The Uses of Diversity: Essays in Polycentricity.  Rowman & Littlefield, 2020. .
 Helping People Help Themselves: From the World Bank to an Alternative Philosophy of Development Assistance. University of Michigan Press, 2005.  .
 Intellectual Trespassing as a Way of Life: Essays in Philosophy, Economics, and Mathematics. Lanham, MD: Rowman & Littlefield, 1995.  .
 Property and Contract in Economics: The Case for Economic Democracy. Cambridge MA: Basil Blackwell, 1992.  .
 The Democratic Worker-Owned Firm. London: Unwin Hyman Limited (HarperCollins Academic), 1990.  ; 2016 reprint .
 Economics, Accounting, and Property Theory. Lexington MA: Lexington Books, 1982.  .

References

External links 
 
 
 David Ellerman profile on the Social Science Research Network

20th-century American philosophers
21st-century American philosophers
Living people
1943 births
MIT School of Humanities, Arts, and Social Sciences alumni
Boston University alumni
Boston College faculty
University of Massachusetts Boston faculty
Tufts University faculty
American expatriates in Slovenia
University of California, Riverside faculty
Academic staff of the University of Ljubljana